D-VHS is a digital video recording format developed by JVC, in collaboration with Hitachi, Matsushita, and Philips. The "D" in D-VHS originally stood for "Data", but JVC renamed the format as "Digital VHS". Released in December of 1997, it uses the same physical cassette format and recording mechanism as S-VHS, but requires higher-quality and more expensive tapes and is capable of recording and displaying both standard-definition and high-definition content. The content data format is in MPEG transport stream, the same data format used for most digital television applications.

Design 

As a final effort for VHS, the D-VHS system had significant advantages as a highly versatile domestic recorder (the other tape-based formats are DV and Digital8, which never gained any traction except as camcorder media), but given the wholesale move to DVD and then hard disk drive (HDD) recording, the format failed to make any headway into the video market.

Existing tape media is bulky and more expensive than hard drives.  Although cable companies are gradually switching to the H.264 codec, this should not be an issue for D-VHS units since they can act purely as data stores (like a hard drive but using tape instead), and thereby pass the previously recorded H.264 data directly to the Set-top Box or TV (via i.Link/FireWire).  Another alternative is a lengthy transfer to a computer for viewing.  Finally, since machines are no longer manufactured, maintenance of current recorders may prove difficult.

D-VHS's primary advantage is that it is still the best way to archive encrypted high definition material from cable programming in the US.  Cable, satellite companies, TiVo, and PCs equipped with cable card tuners all offered high-definition digital video recorders, but archival has proven to be an obstacle, as proprietary boxes have restrictions on moving encrypted content. Outside of D-VHS, only HD capture devices that use an analog conversion process, such as the Hauppauge HD PVR, have enabled removal of encrypted content off many of the above proprietary boxes. This uses an analog conversion process, producing slightly degraded but still high definition grade recordings. D-VHS, on the other hand, does not need to take advantage of this so-called "analog hole", since D-VHS makes a pure bit-for-bit recording with no conversion necessary. This is made possible by compliance with CCI flag values carried by the digital streams, wherein only D-VHS is allowed to digitally move recordings of content originally flagged as Copy Once off of a DVR device and onto a D-VHS tape. This programming that complies with the CCI flags then marks such material on the tape such that no second generation copies can be made from the tape itself, though additional copies can still be made directly from the original DVR unit to additional tapes.

Monthly rental fees to cable, TiVo, and satellite were also less with D-VHS.

The JVC D-VHS deck released in the UK, was not a bitstream recorder, although it did have a FireWire input. Instead it is best thought of as a digital recorder for traditional analog inputs such as domestic analog TV and digiboxes for digital broadcasts. The deck was able to record D-VHS signals onto S-VHS tapes, which made it a cost-effective source of high quality domestic recordings (the US version also allows use of cheaper S-VHS media). Pictures were noticeably superior to S-VHS and were essentially transparent when compared to an off-air source. Using the LS3 mode, approximately 17.25 hours of digital video could be stored on a S-VHS E-240.  The deck's biggest shortcomings were the lack of a DV output and, perhaps more crucially, the lack of RGB input via the SCART connector. NTSC versions had component video outputs.

Tape length and speeds 

D-VHS VCRs can record at multiple speeds.  "HS" is "High Speed", "STD" is "Standard" and "LS" is "Low Speed"; where LS3 and LS5 represent 3 and 5 times the standard length of tape, respectively.  High-definition content such as 1920x1080 or 1280x720 is typically stored at 28.2 Mbit/s (HS speed). Standard-definition content such as 720x576 (720x480) can be stored at bit rates from 14.1 Mbit/s down to 2.8 Mbit/s (STD, LS3, LS5 speeds).

The quality of STD speed is actually superior to the average DVD, since this speed has a much higher bitrate (approximately 14 versus 5 Mbit/s average) and suffers few compression artifacts.  The LS3 speed is roughly equal to an amateur DVD with some visible artifacts in high-action scenes (4.7 Mbit/s), and LS5 appears similar to a medium-quality video download (2.8 Mbit/s).  JVC's HM-DH40000U and SR-VD400U were the only units to support LS5 recording.

As a result of all these different speeds, the tape labels are a bit confusing for the consumer.  D-VHS was originally a standard definition format that recorded at the STD speed.  When High Definition recording and HS speed was later introduced, it required twice the amount of tape. For this reason, a DF-240 will record 240 minutes of standard definition, and 240/2 = 120 minutes of high definition.    When reviewing the table, note that the digital speeds HS and STD are equivalent to the older analog speeds SP and LP.

Pre-recorded tapes 

In 2002, prerecorded D-VHS cassettes were sold under the brand name D-Theater in the US. While D-Theater is a D-VHS tape, it is incompatible with D-VHS decks not bearing the D-Theater logo. They provide content in both 720p and 1080i as well as at least one Dolby Digital audio track. Supported films studios include 20th Century Fox, Artisan Entertainment, DreamWorks, and Universal Pictures. D-Theater does have region code restrictions. There are 3 known regions; 1 for the USA, 2 for Japan, and 3 for South Korea. There has never been a D-Theater video release in region 2 or 3. Region code hacks for Japanese decks have been performed to support playback of US titles. The last film available was 20th Century Fox's I, Robot. This title was a surprise to many as there were no prior announcements nor any indication that the title was available. It was originally available only on JVC's D-VHS store in late 2004 and no other distributor had it (not even Fox itself). A couple of weeks later they started trickling out to more distributors after much delay and confusion about its existence. Alien vs. Predator was announced to retailers as also being released on the same day as I, Robot, but Fox later announced that Alien vs. Predator was never shipped to retailers.

Most tapes have built-in copy protection mechanism (DTCP, also known as "5c") (copy never) that disables copying via FireWire. HDNet productions and 2929 Entertainment via Magnolia Entertainment did provide some of their original content on D-VHS but without copy protection. Many of the tapes have an introduction by owner Mark Cuban encouraging the viewer to make copies of the program in order to help distribute them.

Additional tracks may be included on D-Theater in other sound formats such as DTS. However, only the newest D-VHS players, like the JVC HM-DH40000, HM-DH5U, HM-DT100U, and Marantz MV-8300, include alternate audio track capabilities.

Compatibility 

There are technical issues with compatibility between recordings from Mitsubishi and JVC D-VHS decks. PAL and NTSC recordings are also incompatible.

Adoption 

Very few models were available to the world market and sales of this format have been weak; correspondingly, prices remained high for both VCRs and media, contributing to low demand. Additionally, low consumer knowledge of D-VHS's advantages and capabilities as well as input limitations led to its eventual demise. The introduction in 2006 of Blu-ray and HD-DVD put the final nail in the D-VHS coffin.

Similar formats 

There has been no small-format version of D-VHS equivalent to VHS-C; JVC, the originator of the format, chose to use MiniDV for its digital camcorder lines, and since 2005 has also expanded into tapeless camcorder designs based on hard drive storage (the Everio line). JVC does market the Digital-S format for professional use; while the tapes and technology used are superficially similar to D-VHS tapes, the underlying data format is based on the DV codec and the media formulation is drastically different. Sony's MicroMV format uses the same codec as D-VHS. Therefore, D-VHS capture software can also be used to transfer MicroMV tapes.

See also 
 Sony HDVS
 ED Beta
 W-VHS
 MicroMV
 HDV
 Blu-ray Disc
 HD-DVD

References

External links 

 Audio Video Science Forum D-VHS list
 LaserDisc Database D-VHS Catalog
 Demonstration video New York City in 1993 in HD - DTheater DVHS Demo Tape

Video storage
VHS
High-definition television
Audiovisual introductions in 1998
Japanese inventions